The National University of Mar del Plata (UNMdP) is an Argentine national university in the  city of Mar del Plata, on the Atlantic coast.

The institution was established in 1962 as the Universidad de la Provincia de Buenos Aires (University of the Province of Buenos Aires). The university acquired its current name in 1975, when under the auspices of the Taquini Plan the Argentine government took over its administration and merged it with the Universidad Católica Stella Maris (Catholic University Stella Maris).

The UNMdP currently includes nine faculties (Architecture, Urbanism and Design, Agricultural Sciences, Economics and Social Sciences, Natural Sciences, Health Sciences and Social Work, Law, Humanities, Engineering and Psychology) and one school (School of Medicine). It offers 50 graduate programmes, 11 pre-graduate programmes, and 48 post-graduate programmes.

Graduate programmes

See also 
Education in Argentina

References

External links

Science and Education in Argentina
Argentine Higher Education Official Site

1962 establishments in Argentina
Mar del Plata
Buildings and structures in Mar del Plata
Educational institutions established in 1962
Universities in Buenos Aires Province